Avala Hejje is a 1981 Indian Kannada-language film, directed by H. R. Bhargava, starring Dr. Vishnuvardhan, Lakshmi, Dr. Ambrish and Dwarakish. This film is partially based on the 1978 Bollywood film Trishna which itself was remade from Tamil film Thoondil Meen. It was remade in Telugu as Bandhalu Anubandhalu. Lakshmi herself was the producer of the movie.

Plot 
The film begins with a stranger chasing Seetha (Lakshmi) trying to molest her. A flashback shows that Lakshmi was Ambareesh's love interest before her marriage to Vishnuvardhan. Lakshmi is now happily married to Vishnuvardhan, who is a neurosurgeon. In the absence of Vishnuvardhan, Ambareesh visits Lakshmi to threaten her. One day Lakshmi unintentionally fires the bullet from her husband's revolver to Ambareesh's forehead and he becomes unconscious. With the help of Dwarakish, Vishnuvardhan's assistant in Hospital, Lakshmi takes Ambareesh's body out of the city and drops it from a bridge, thinking he has died. Without knowing all these incidents, Vishnuvardhan returns to home and finds one of the bullets missing in the revolver, which is clarified by Lakshmi's arguments.  Unknowingly, Ambareesh is admitted to Vishnu's hospital and he forgets all his past. Doctor Vishnu treats him and is determined to cure him. When Ambareesh recalls his past, he sees Vishnu, who will be his brother, who he lost in his childhood and recalls everything. The rest of the story is about how Vishnu and Ambareesh confront each other and solve the problems.

This film is known for its songs and good acting by Lakshmi and humorous role of Dwarakish. The movie had a successful run of 25 weeks in Bangalore, total box office collection was 50 lakhs.

Cast 
 
Vishnuvardhan 
Lakshmi as Seetha
Ambareesh as Ranga
Dwarakish 
Sundar Krishna Urs
Seetharam

Soundtrack
The music was composed by Rajan–Nagendra.

References

External links 
 
 

1981 films
1980s Kannada-language films
Films scored by Rajan–Nagendra
Kannada films remade in other languages
Films directed by H. R. Bhargava